Mariánské Lázně Airport is an airport serving Mariánské Lázně in the Karlovy Vary Region of the Czech Republic.

Facilities

References

External links
  Letiště Skláře- Mariánské Lázně
 
 

Airports in the Czech Republic
Karlovy Vary Region